Bolt Food is an online food ordering and delivery platform launched by Bolt in 2019. Meals and groceries are delivered by couriers using cars, scooters, bikes, or on foot. Bolt Food is operational in over 80 cities across 19 countries as of 2023.

The service has more than 6 million registered users globally, and features more than 30,000 partner restaurants and chains.

In 2021, Bolt Food launched its rapid grocery delivery service, Bolt Market.

History 

Transport company, Bolt diversified into food delivery in August 2019, launching Bolt Food in Tallinn, Estonia and announcing plans to expand the service to Latvia, Lithuania, and South Africa later that year.

During the launch, Bolt's Chief Product Officer, Jevgeni Kabanov, said that establishing a food delivery service had been a popular request from existing Bolt users for quite some time.

In April 2021, the Bolt Food app was added to the Huawei AppGallery after Huawei claimed to have received more than 2,000 requests for users to onboard the mobile app.

In August 2021, Bolt raised €600 million to launch the Bolt Market grocery delivery service.

In January 2022, the company announced that it had raised €628 million at a €7.4 billion valuation to expand its transport and food delivery super app.

As of January 2023, Bolt Food operates in more than 80 cities and 19 countries in Europe and Africa.

Grocery delivery 
In 2021, Bolt announced the launch of Bolt Market, a grocery delivery service available on the Bolt Food app.

Bolt Market stores offer delivery of groceries and household essentials like pet care, personal care, baby care and home care products. The service expanded its selection to more than 3,000 products per store and has matched supermarket prices for hundreds of key products.

Bolt Market launched in Tallinn, Estonia and expanded to Latvia, Lithuania, Portugal, Romania, Poland, Slovakia, Croatia, and the Czech Republic in 2021 and Sweden in January 2022.

As of January 2023, Bolt Market is operational in 6 countries.

See also
 Bolt

References

External links

2019 establishments in Estonia